Veterinary technicians and technologists in Turkey are represented by Veteriner Saglik Teknisyenleri Dernegi (Association of Veterinary Technicians in Turkey).  Veterinary technicians are trained in Veterinary Health Technology High Schools (Veteriner Sağlık Meslek Lisesi) of which there are four in the country:
 Istanbul Veterinary Health Technology High School
 Samsun Veterinary Health Technology High School
 Konya Veterinary Health Technology High School
 Isparta Veterinary Health Technology High School
Each of these high schools is equipped with a complete veterinary practice.

Veterinary technologists hold a university awarded associate degree for which graduation from a Veterinary Health Technology High School is prerequisite.  Programs offering these degrees include:
 Anadolu University Laboratory and Veterinary Technology Program
 Atatürk University Animal Breeding and Health Program (which awards the title of Animal Health Technologist)
 Istanbul University Veterinary Faculty College Equine Health Technologists Program

While veterinary technicians and technologists function as support personnel for veterinarians in Turkey, some open their own limited practices where they are permitted to perform procedures such as vaccination, artificial insemination, animal health consulting, and male castration of livestock.

References

External links
Association of Veterinary Technicians in Turkey

Turkey
Veterinary medicine in Turkey